Singapore Airlines (abbreviation: SIA) is the flag carrier airline of the Republic of Singapore with its hub located at Singapore Changi Airport. The airline is notable for highlighting the Singapore Girl as its central figure in corporate branding segment. It has been ranked as the world's best airline by Skytrax four times.

Singapore Airlines Group has more than 20 subsidiaries, including numerous airline-related subsidiaries. SIA Engineering Company handles maintenance, repair and overall (MRO) business across nine countries with a portfolio of 27 joint ventures including with Boeing and Rolls-Royce. Singapore Airlines Cargo operates SIA's freighter fleet and manages the cargo-hold capacity in SIA's passenger aircraft. Scoot, a wholly owned subsidiary operates as a low-cost carrier.

Singapore Airlines was the first to put the Airbus A380—the world's largest passenger aircraft—as well as the Boeing 787-10 into service and is the only operator of the ultra long-range version of the Airbus A350-900. It ranks amongst the top 15 carriers worldwide in terms of revenue passenger kilometers and is ranked tenth in the world for international passengers carried. Singapore Airlines was voted as the Skytrax World's Best Airline Cabin Crew 2019. The airline has also won the second and fourth positions as the World's Best Airlines and World's Cleanest Airlines respectively in 2019.

History

Corporate affairs

Singapore Airlines is majority-owned by the Singapore government investment and holding company Temasek Holdings, which held 55% of voting stock as at 31 March 2020.

The Singapore government, which holds a golden share via the country's Ministry of Finance, has stressed its non-involvement in the management of the company, a point emphasized by Minister Mentor Lee Kuan Yew when he said the Singapore Changi Airport's front-runner status as an aviation hub is more important than the SIA. However, he was personally involved in easing tensions between the company and its pilots in the early 2000s, warned the airline to cut costs, and made public his advice to the airline to divest from its subsidiary companies.

Singapore Airlines is headquartered at Airline House, a former hangar at the Changi Airport in Singapore.

Branding

Branding and publicity efforts have revolved primarily around flight crew, in contrast to most other airlines, who tend to emphasise aircraft and services in general. In particular, the promotion of its female flight attendants known as Singapore Girls has been widely successful and is a common feature in most of the airline's advertisements and publications.

The Singapore Airlines logo is a bird, inspired by a dagger featured in regional folklore known as a silver kris or keris. The kris is central in Singapore Airlines' branding, such as the SilverKris lounge and the KrisWorld entertainment system. The logo has remained unchanged since Singapore Airlines' inception from the split of Malaysia–Singapore Airlines, except for a minor tweak in 1987.

Destinations

Singapore Airlines flies to 75 destinations in 32 countries on five continents from its primary hub in Singapore.

After the Asian financial crisis in 1997, Singapore Airlines discontinued its routes to Kagoshima, Berlin, Darwin, Cairns, Hangzhou and Sendai. Toronto was discontinued in 1994. During the SARS outbreak in 2003–04, Singapore Airlines ceased flights to Brussels, Las Vegas, Chicago, Hiroshima, Kaohsiung, Mauritius, Vienna, Madrid, Shenzhen and Surabaya. Singapore Airlines discontinued flights to Vancouver and Amritsar in 2009, and São Paulo in 2016.

The airline has a key role on the Kangaroo Route, operating flights between Australia and the United Kingdom via Singapore. It flew 11.0% of all international traffic into and out of Australia in the month ended March 2008. Six destinations apiece are served in Australia and India, more than anywhere else. Singapore Airlines also operated flights between Singapore and Wellington, New Zealand via Canberra until May 2018, when the intermediate stop was changed to Melbourne. This route was known as the Capital Express. The route was suspended in 2020 due to the COVID-19 pandemic.

Singapore Airlines has taken advantage of liberal bilateral aviation agreements between Singapore and Thailand, and with the United Arab Emirates, to offer more onward connections from Bangkok and Dubai, respectively.

In 2005 AirAsia, a low-cost carrier (LCC) based in Malaysia, accused Singapore Airlines of double standards, when it claimed that the Government of Singapore attempted to keep it out of the Singapore market, despite desiring to fly routes out of Australia itself.  In 2007 Singapore Airlines welcomed the liberalization of the Singapore-Kuala Lumpur route, previously restricted to Singapore Airlines and Malaysia Airlines under rules designed to protect the state-run airlines from competition for over three decades, accounting for about 85% of the over 200 flight frequencies then operated. A highly lucrative route for LCCs due to its short distance and heavy traffic as the fourth-busiest in Asia, bringing Singapore Airline's capacity share on the route down to about 46.7%, Malaysia Airlines' down to 25.3%, and increase to 17.3% to the three LCCs now permitted on the route, and the remainder shared by three other airlines as of 22 September 2008. Until 1 December 2008, Singapore Airlines operated six flights per day. From 1 December 2008 when the route was completely opened, Singapore Airlines operated four flights per day plans, while its sister airline SilkAir also operated four flights per day. Malaysia Airlines, the main opponent to liberalisation of the route and deemed to be the party which stands to lose the most, continued to codeshare with both Singapore Airlines and SilkAir on the route.

Singapore Airlines operated two of the longest flights in the world, both nonstop flights from Singapore to Los Angeles and Newark with Airbus A340-500 aircraft. All A340-500s were phased out in 2013 and nonstop flights to both destinations were terminated. Nonstop service to Los Angeles was terminated on 20 October 2013 (the airline continues to serve Los Angeles from Singapore via Tokyo-Narita), and the nonstop service to Newark was terminated on 23 November 2013 in favour of a Singapore-New York JFK route via Frankfurt.

From 23 October 2016, Singapore Airlines resumed non-stop flights from Singapore to the United States, beginning with San Francisco. The route is flown by the A350-900 aircraft and includes Business, Premium Economy, and Economy classes. This was followed by the resumption of non-stop flights to Newark and Los Angeles from 11 October 2018 and 2 November 2018, respectively, with the delivery of the Airbus A350-900ULRs, allowing the airline to operate two of the world's longest non-stop flights again.

On 14 October 2015, Singapore Airlines announced plans to resume the world's longest non-stop flight between Singapore and New York – a 15,300 km (9,500 mi), 19-hour route that the airline had dropped in 2013. A340-500 aircraft were formerly employed to serve this route until their retirement in 2013. SIA resumed the route following the acquisition of new Airbus A350-900ULR aircraft on 18 October 2018. At the time, Singapore Airlines Flights 21 and 22 was the longest scheduled route in the world. It was suspended again in March 2020 due to COVID-19 pandemic, and resumed in March 2022.

On 9 November 2020, SIA relaunched the nonstop flights between Changi Airport and New York, but this time to John F. Kennedy International Airport, three times a week. The route, Singapore Airlines Flights 23 and 24, is the longest scheduled flight in the world.

Codeshare agreements
Singapore Airlines codeshares with the following airlines:

 Aegean Airlines
 Air Canada
 Air China
 Air France
 Air Mauritius
 Air New Zealand
 Air Timor
 Alaska Airlines
 All Nippon Airways
 Asiana Airlines
 Austrian Airlines
 Avianca
 Brussels Airlines
 Croatia Airlines
 Egyptair
 Eurowings
 Ethiopian Airlines
 EVA Air
 Fiji Airways
 Garuda Indonesia
 JetBlue
 LOT Polish Airlines
 Lufthansa
 Malaysia Airlines
 Royal Brunei Airlines
 S7 Airlines
 Scandinavian Airlines
 Scoot (Subsidiary)
 Shenzhen Airlines
 South African Airways
 SriLankan Airlines
 Swiss International Air Lines
 TAP Air Portugal
 Thai Airways International
 Turkish Airlines
 United Airlines
 Virgin Atlantic
 Virgin Australia
 Vistara

Fleet

Singapore Airlines operates a fleet of 146 Airbus and Boeing passenger aircraft including 9 freighters. As of 1 April 2020, the average passenger aircraft age stands at 5 years 11 months.

Livery

Original MSA livery (1966–1972) 
In May 1966 Malaysian Airways (MAL) became Malaysia-Singapore Airlines (MSA). The original MSA livery features a yellow MSA logo on the vertical stabilizer and a black nose, with a white and grey fuselage. All aircraft in this original livery have been repainted or retired.

Second-generation livery (1972–1987) 
The second-generation livery features a blue and yellow strip on the windows on the white fuselage, with the kris bird logo. The word "Singapore Airlines" is stylized in italics.

Current livery (1987-present) 
The current livery has only some minor changes and the gold blue color scheme, along with the bird logo, has been retained. In the change to the current livery, the yellow rear fuselage was changed to metallic gold and the font typeface of the word "Singapore Airlines" was modified.

Services

Cabins
Singapore Airlines offers five classes of service – Suites, First class, Business class, Premium Economy class, and Economy class. Major upgrades to its cabin and in-flight service were announced on 17 October 2006, constituting the first major overhaul in over eight years and costing the airline approximately S$570 million. Initially planned for the Airbus A380-800's introduction into service in 2006, and subsequently on the Boeing 777-300ER, the postponement of the first A380-800 delivery meant it had to be introduced with the launch of the first Boeing 777-300ER with the airline on 5 December 2006 between Singapore and Paris.

On 9 July 2013, Singapore Airlines, in collaboration with two design firms, James Park Associates and DesignworksUSA, unveiled the next generation of cabin products for First, Business, and Economy class, which entered service onboard new Boeing 777-300ERs and Airbus A350s. London was the first city served with the new product in September 2013. The product was later extended to all Boeing 777-300ERs.

On 2 November 2017, Singapore Airlines unveiled new cabin products for Suites, Business, Premium Economy and Economy Class, exclusive to the airline's Airbus A380-800 aircraft. These new changes cost roughly S$1.16 billion and were rolled out in response to growing competition from Middle Eastern carriers such as Emirates, Etihad Airways and Qatar Airways. The seating configuration in the new design consists of 6 Suites and 78 Business Class seats on the upper deck, with 44 Premium Economy Class seats and 343 Economy Class seats on the lower deck. The new changes were rolled out on the five new Airbus A380 aircraft that were delivered to Singapore Airlines, while the existing A380 fleet had these new products retrofitted until 2020. Sydney was the first city served with the new product on 18 December 2017.

Singapore Airlines Suites
Singapore Airlines Suites is a class available only on the Airbus A380-800. The  bed is separate from the seat and folds out from the back wall, with several other components of the suite lowering to accommodate the mattress. Windows are built into the doors and blinds offer privacy. Suites located in the centre (rows 2 and 3 only) can form a double bed after the privacy blinds between them are retracted into special compartments between the beds and in the frame of the partition. There are 12 seats at the front of the lower deck of the Airbus A380-800 aircraft, with the first and last rows in a 1-1 configuration, and the second and third rows in a 1-2-1 configuration.

Unveiled on 2 November 2017, the "New A380 Suites" are being progressively rolled out on the Airbus A380-800 fleet. They consist of six suites, manufactured by Zodiac Aerospace as separate compartments with walls and sliding doors in a 1-1 configuration on the forward upper deck. The suite itself consists of a free-standing seat and a separately deployable  flatbed, as well as a  touchscreen LCD TV,  mounted on the side wall. The leather seat, also upholstered by Poltrona Frau of Italy, is able to recline 45 degrees and rotate 360 degrees. The first two suites on either side of the aircraft can form a double bed after the privacy divider is lowered, similar to the old Suites product. Additional features include a separate wireless touchscreen control tablet located upon the credenza for controlling lighting, window blinds and service calls, a Lalique personal amenity kit, an inbuilt personal closet and bag storage area, and a power socket and USB port all in a single panel. There is a dedicated spacious first class lavatory on the second deck with additional Lalique amenities.

First class
Introduced on 9 July 2013, the "New" First Class is offered on refitted Boeing 777-300ERs.

The "Other" First Class is offered only on Boeing 777-300 aircraft. Designed by James Park Associates, it features a  seat upholstered with leather and mahogany and a  LCD screen. The seats fold out into a flat bed and are also arranged in a 1-2-1 configuration.

Business class
Business Class was known as Raffles Class until 2006. The latest version of the Business Class, the "New" Business Class, was unveiled on 9 July 2013 and is available on refitted Boeing B777-300ERs and the Airbus A350-900. Features include power socket and ports all in one panel, stowage beside the seat, two new seating positions, arranged in a 1-2-1 configuration and an 18-inch in-flight entertainment screen. The seat has a recline of 132 degrees and can be folded into a  length bed.

Long Haul Business Class is available on Airbus A380 and refitted Boeing 777-200ER aircraft, where a fully flat bed is available in a 1-2-1 configuration featuring  of seat width. These seats are forward-facing, in contrast to the herring-bone configuration used by several other airlines offering flat beds in business class. The leather seats feature a  diagonal screen-size personal television, in-seat power supply and two USB ports. The product was voted the world's best business class by Skytrax in 2011.

On eight Airbus A380 aircraft, the first of which entered service in October 2011, Singapore Airlines dedicated the entire upper deck to the Business class cabin, unlike the original configuration's upper deck shared by 16 rows of business class and 11 rows of economy at the rear.

Medium and Short Haul Business Class is available on all Airbus A330-300, Boeing 777-300 and all unrefitted Boeing 777-200 aircraft, configured in 2-2-2 layout and with iPod connectivity, only available in the A330. The Business Class seat is lie-flat at an eight-degree incline, featuring Krisworld on a  screen.

On 28 March 2018, the new regional Business Class was unveiled following the delivery of the first Boeing 787-10. These new seats manufactured by Stelia Aerospace are arranged in a forward-facing 1-2-1 staggered configuration, providing every passenger direct aisle access. There are also adjustable dividers at the centre seats to provide passengers with a "customised level of privacy".

Unveiled on 2 November 2017, the "New A380 Business class" seats are being progressively rolled out on the Airbus A380-800 fleet. There are 78 Business class seats on the aircraft, offered in a 1-2-1 configuration behind the Singapore Airlines Suites on the upper deck. The seats, designed by JPA Design and upholstered with Poltrona Frau grain leather, can be reclined into a fully-flat bed. There are also adjustable dividers between the centre seats that can either be fully raised, half raised or fully lowered. The pair of centre seats directly behind each bulkhead, when the centre divider is fully lowered, can form double beds. There is also an  touchscreen LCD TV and a panel containing a power and USB port, as well as an NFC reader for contactless payments.

Premium Economy class
On 9 August 2015, Singapore Airlines introduced an all-new premium economy class, with the seats manufactured by ZIM Flugsitz, to be installed on its Airbus A380, B777-300ER and Airbus A350-900 aircraft. The product was first flown from Singapore to Sydney, Hong Kong and Auckland and has been rolled out to other routes.

Economy class

The latest redesign of the economy class seat was unveiled on 9 July 2013 alongside new first and business class products. Features include  of legroom, slimmer seats, an adjustable headrest, and an  touch-screen inflight entertainment system which is also controllable with a video touch-screen handset as well as brand new KrisWorld software. The new seats were originally announced to only be available exclusively onboard factory-fresh Airbus A350-900 and refitted Boeing 777-300ER.

These are configured 3-4-3 on the lower deck of the Airbus A380, 3-3-3 on the Boeing 777, and 2-4-2 on the Airbus A330, as well as the upper deck of the Airbus A380. Other features include an independent cup-holder (separate from the fold-out table), a USB port, and a power socket, as well as an iPod port exclusively on board the Airbus A330.

Singapore Airlines introduced a similar design on board the Boeing 777 aircraft through its ongoing cabin retrofit program. The Boeing 777-300 was the first model to undergo refit and had introduced the product on the Singapore–Sydney route on 22 July 2009. They are equipped with slightly smaller 9-inch screens (which are, however, larger than the 6.1-inch VGA screens on unrefitted aircraft) and AVOD in each seat. The seats are installed onboard all B777-200ERs and all but one B777-200.

Catering

Singapore Airlines offers a wide array of food options on each flight. Regional dishes are often served on their respective flights, such as the Kyo-Kaiseki, Shi Quan Shi Mei, and Shahi Thali meals are available for first-class passengers on flights to Japan, China and India, respectively.

SIA has also introduced a Popular Local Fare culinary programme offering local favourites to passengers in all classes flying from selected destinations. The dishes featured in this programme included Singaporean hawker fare such as Teochew porridge, bak chor mee, Hainanese chicken rice, Satay (meat skewers), etc. are also featured on certain routes.

They published a cookbook in 2010 titled, Above & Beyond: A Collection of Recipes from the Singapore Airlines Culinary Panel.

Passengers in Suites, First and Business class may choose to use the "Book the Cook" service, where specific dishes may be selected in advance from a more extensive menu. Premium Economy class passengers may also choose to use the "Premium Economy Book the Cook". This service is only available on selected flights.

In-flight entertainment
KrisWorld is Singapore Airlines' in-flight entertainment system, introduced in 1997 on Boeing 747-400, Airbus A310-300, Airbus A340-300 and Boeing 777-200 aircraft. KrisFlyer overhauled Singapore Airlines' in-flight experience with a new, cheaper entertainment solution that would supersede the primitive Thales entertainment systems on offer at that time by Virgin Atlantic and the Emirates Google Doodle for its fifth anniversary.

The original KrisWorld introduced 14 movies, 36 television programmes, and 5 cartoons, as well as many Super NES games, KrisFone and fax, text news and flight path in all classes. The original KrisWorld was subsequently upgraded to feature Wisemen 3000, an audio and video-on-demand version of the KrisWorld system featured exclusively in First and Raffles Class cabins, then progressively introduced into Economy Class in 747 cabins and selected 777 cabins.

In 2002, Singapore Airlines introduced a re-branding of the KrisWorld system. Named Enhanced KrisWorld, it featured additional movies, television programming, music and games, and was installed on Boeing 747-400 and selected Boeing 777-200 aircraft. Connexion by Boeing, an in-flight Internet service, was introduced in 2005. Live television streaming was proposed on Connexion, but this service was discontinued in December 2006. Since October 2005, Singapore Airlines has offered complimentary language lessons by Berlitz. and, starting December 2005, live text-news feeds.

In 2007, a new KrisWorld based on Red Hat Enterprise Linux was introduced, featuring a new interface, additional programming and audio and video on demand as standard. Widescreen personal video systems were installed in all cabins, including 23-inch LCD monitors in First Class, 15-inch monitors in Business Class, and 10.6-inch monitors in Economy Class. The new KrisWorld is available on Airbus A330, Airbus A380 and Boeing 777-300ER. Features include,

 Widescreen LCD TV with 1280 × 768 resolution
 A range of movies, TV, music, games and interactive programs
 Built-in office software, based on the StarOffice Productivity Suite for use with the USB port
 In-seat AC power ports

A $400 million new KrisWorld entertainment system was unveiled in 2012. This comes from a major deal with Panasonic Avionics, which will provide the latest Panasonic eX3 systems. The eX3 system features a larger screen with much higher resolution, wide touch-screen controllers, new software, and, above all, in-flight connectivity. Singapore Airlines launched its in-flight connectivity in August 2012. Passengers are now able to make phone calls, send text messages and access the Internet for a fee. The new eX3 systems are unveiled alongside the new cabin product, and are available on the Airbus A350-900 and refitted B777-300ER aircraft. In-flight connectivity is offered on the aforementioned two aircraft as well as select Airbus A380s.

Frequent flyer programme
KrisFlyer is the frequent flyer programme for the Singapore Airlines Group, comprising Singapore Airlines and Scoot. Besides the airlines in the Singapore Airlines Group, KrisFlyer members can earn miles when flying with any Star Alliance airline, Star Alliance Connecting Partner, Alaska Airlines, JetBlue, Olympic Air, Virgin Atlantic, Virgin Australia and Vistara. Miles can also be earned with over 200 partners in the air and on the ground.

KrisFlyer miles can be redeemed for flights and upgrades when flying with the Singapore Airlines Group and selected partner airlines, as well as converting them to points with selected partner loyalty programmes. Miles can also be mixed with cash to pay for award tickets and flight upgrades on the Singapore Airlines website, as well as purchases made from KrisShop.

KrisFlyer is divided into the following tiers:
 KrisFlyer – The basic level at which one starts earning miles,
 KrisFlyer Elite Silver – The airline's rendition of Star Alliance's Silver tier of passengers,
 KrisFlyer Elite Gold – The airline's rendition of Star Alliance's Gold tier of passengers,
 Priority Passenger Service (PPS) Club – Provides Star Alliance Gold privileges on Singapore Airlines, Star Alliance members and partner airlines, as well as further privileges on Singapore Airlines.
 Solitaire PPS Club - The top tier. Additional privileges on top of those accorded to PPS Club members.

Senior leadership 

 Chairman: Peter Seah Lim Huat (since January 2017)
 Chief Executive: Goh Choon Phong (since January 2011)

List of former chairmen 

 J. Y. Pillay (1972–1996)
 Michael Fam Yue Onn (1997–2001)
 Koh Boon Hwee (2001–2005)
 Stephen Lee Ching Yen (2006–2016)

List of former chief executives 

 Lim Chin Beng (1972–1982)
 Cheong Choong Kong (1984–2003)
 Chew Choon Seng (2003–2010)

Controversies
In February 2019, TechCrunch reported that the Singapore Airlines mobile app in the iOS App Store was using session-replay functionality to record users' activities and send the data to Israeli firm Glassbox without the users' informed consent, compromising users' privacy and contravening the rules of the iOS App Store.

Accidents and incidents 

 13 July 1982 – A Boeing 747 operating as Singapore Airlines flight SQ-21A between Singapore and Melbourne flew into volcanic ash from erupting Galunggung volcano and experienced multiple engine failures. A two-engine emergency landing was made at Jakarta and all four engines were replaced.
 26 March 1991 – Singapore Airlines Flight 117, an Airbus A310-300, was hijacked by militants en route from Sultan Abdul Aziz Shah Airport to Singapore Changi International Airport, where it was stormed by the Singapore Special Operations Force. All hijackers were killed in the operation, with no fatalities amongst the passengers and crew.
 31 October 2000 – Singapore Airlines Flight 006, a Boeing 747-400, attempted to take off on the wrong runway at Taiwan Taoyuan International Airport (previously Chiang Kai-shek International Airport) while departing for Los Angeles International Airport. It collided with the construction equipment that was parked on a closed runway, killing 83 of the 179 onboard and injuring a further 71 people. This was the first and only fatal accident of a Singapore Airlines aircraft to date. The aircraft 9V-SPK was painted in a "Tropical" promotional livery at the time of the accident. The only other aircraft painted with the promotional livery, another 747-400 registered 9V-SPL, was immediately removed from service and repainted with standard Singapore Airlines livery.
 12 March 2003 – A Boeing 747-400 operating as Singapore Airlines Flight 286 from Auckland International Airport to Changi Airport was involved in a tailstrike while taking off from Auckland's Runway 23L, causing severe damage to the aircraft's tail and damaging the APU (Auxiliary Power Unit), causing in-flight APU fire warnings. The flight returned to Auckland with no fatalities or injuries on board. The cause was later determined to be an error in the pilots' calculations of the aircraft's takeoff weight and reference speeds, which caused the pilots to rotate the aircraft prematurely.
 27 June 2016 – Singapore Airlines Flight 368, a Boeing 777-300ER, with 222 passengers and 19 crew on board, suffered an engine oil-leak during a flight from Singapore to Milan. The oil-leak alarm was sounded above Malaysia, two hours into the flight. During the emergency landing at the point of origin, Singapore Changi Airport, the right engine caught fire, leading to the right-wing being engulfed in flames. The fire was extinguished within five minutes after the plane landed. No injuries were reported.
 28 September 2022 – A drunken passenger onboard the Singapore Airlines Flight 33 from San Francisco to Singapore made bomb threats and also inappropriately touched other people. The Republic of Singapore Air Force scrambled their F-16 Fighting Falcons to escort the plane to Changi Airport where the airliner was searched and the threat was declared to be false thereafter.

See also

 List of airlines of Singapore
 Transport in Singapore

References

External links

 

 
Airlines of Singapore
Airlines established in 1947
Temasek Holdings
Multinational companies headquartered in Singapore
Government-owned airlines
Government-owned companies of Singapore
Singaporean brands
Transport operators of Singapore
Association of Asia Pacific Airlines
Star Alliance
Companies listed on the Singapore Exchange
1947 establishments in Singapore